Andringitra may refer to:
 Andringitra, region in Madagascaar
 Andringitra Massif
 Andringitra National Park
 Andringitra (plant), a genus of flowering plants in the family Malvaceae. The genus is native to Madagascar